Ashahoor, (or Asha Hoor) is a medium size village in Phillaur tehsil of Jalandhar District of Punjab State, India. It is located 3.2 km from Nagar, 9 km from postal head office in Phillaur, 53 km from Jalandhar and 118 km from state capital Chandigarh. The village is administrated by a sarpanch who is an elected representative of village as per Panchayati raj (India).

Education 
The village has a Punjabi medium, Co-educational primary school (GPS Ashahoor School) founded in 1996. The schools provide mid-day meal as per Indian Midday Meal Scheme and the meal prepared in school premises.

Transport

Rail 
Phillaur Junction is the nearest train station however, Bhatian Railway Station is 13 km away from the village.

Air 
The nearest domestic airport is located 41 km away in Ludhiana and the nearest international airport is located in Chandigarh also a second nearest international airport is 147 km away in Amritsar.

References 

Villages in Jalandhar district
Villages in Phillaur tehsil